Ulsan Public Stadium was a multi-purpose stadium located in Ulsan, South Korea. In 2003, the city of Ulsan demolished the stadium and built the Ulsan Sports Complex at the same location.

See also
 Ulsan Stadium

References
울산공설운동장 – Dream stadium of K-League

External links

Athletics (track and field) venues in South Korea
Defunct football venues in South Korea
K League 1 stadiums
Multi-purpose stadiums in South Korea
Sports venues in Ulsan
Sports venues completed in 1970
Sports venues demolished in 2003